Oryzisolibacter is a Gram-negative and motile genus of bacteria from the family of Comamonadaceae with one known species (Oryzisolibacter propanilivorax).

References

Comamonadaceae
Bacteria genera
Monotypic bacteria genera